Jean-Jacques Dicker (born June 27, 1944 in Geneva, Switzerland) is a Swiss-French-American photographer, best known for his documentary photography of Africa and Southeast Asia and fine art photography including portraits and nudes.

Background 
Jean-Jacques Dicker was born in Geneva, Switzerland. He is the grandson of the actors Georges Pitoëff and Ludmilla Pitoëff.
He traveled through Africa during three years in 1977 and 1978, and then again in 1984, to document many aspects of life in remote villages, including the inner life of prostitutes throughout the continent.

Awards
Nikon Photo Contest International 1973: Black and White Division (Third Prize). Tokyo, Japan
Nikon Photo Contest International 1974: Black and White Division (Third Prize). Tokyo, Japan
Bourse Fédérale des Arts Appliqués, (1974 and 1980) Berne, Switzerland.

Books and articles
Jean-Jacques Dicker's work has been published in two books: Africa, and Empty Rooms  and other journals and magazines. Among them: The International Journal for transpersonal studies, and the Honolulu StarBulletin.

References

External links
 (www.jeanjacquesdicker.com)

1944 births
Living people
Photographers from Geneva